Alkali Lake is an unincorporated community in the Cariboo region of the Central Interior of British Columbia, Canada, located 40 kilometres south of the city of Williams Lake en route to Dog Creek and the Gang Ranch, at about 780 m (2560 ft) above sea level.  The settlement, and the adjoining reserves of the Alkali Lake Indian Band, get their name from Alkali Lake, which gets its name from an outcrop of alkali on the hillside above it; the lake itself is not an alkali lake.

The economy of the area is based on cattle ranching and small scale tourism, although in the past it was important as a way station on one of the various trails to the Cariboo goldfields farther north.  Alkali Lake Indian Reserve No. 1, one of the main reserves of the Alkali Lake Indian Band, is located within the community.  Most other reserves of the band are located to its east.

A documentary feature film about the community, "Honour of All: The Story of Alkali Lake", was produced Phil Lucas in 1985.

References

Unincorporated settlements in British Columbia
Geography of the Cariboo
Populated places in the Cariboo Regional District